Milan Jambor (born 27 November 1975 in Poprad) is a Slovak football midfielder and player-coach of FK Svit.

Club
As a player of FK Matador Púchov, Jambor famously scored the late equalizer against FC Barcelona in the first leg of the first round of the 2003–04 UEFA Cup, with the match ending 1-1. FC Barcelona won the second leg at the Nou Camp 8-0.

Personal life 
His son, Timotej Jambor, is also a footballer. He currently plays for MŠK Žilina.

References

External links

1975 births
Living people
Slovak footballers
Association football midfielders
Association football player-managers
1. FC Tatran Prešov players
FC VSS Košice players
MŠK Púchov players
Czech First League players
FK Viktoria Žižkov players
Slovak Super Liga players
Expatriate footballers in the Czech Republic
Slovak football managers
Sportspeople from Poprad